In mathematics, especially in functional analysis, the Tsirelson space is the first example of a Banach space in which neither an ℓ p space nor a c0 space can be embedded. The Tsirelson space is reflexive.

It was introduced by B. S. Tsirelson in 1974. The same year, Figiel and Johnson published a related article where they used the notation T for the dual of  Tsirelson's example. Today, the letter T is the standard notation for the dual of the original example, while the original Tsirelson example is denoted by T*. In T* or in T, no subspace is isomorphic, as Banach space, to an ℓ p space, 1 ≤ p < ∞, or to c0.

Also, new attempts in the early '70s to promote a geometric theory of Banach spaces led to ask  whether or not every infinite-dimensional Banach space has a subspace isomorphic to some ℓ p or to c0.

The radically new Tsirelson construction is at the root of several further developments in Banach space theory: the arbitrarily distortable space of Schlumprecht, on which depend Gowers' solution to Banach's hyperplane problem and the Odell–Schlumprecht solution to the distortion problem. Also, several results of Argyros et al. are based on ordinal refinements of the Tsirelson construction, culminating with the solution by Argyros–Haydon of the scalar plus compact problem.

Tsirelson's construction 

On the vector space ℓ∞ of bounded scalar sequences  , let Pn denote the linear operator which sets to zero all coordinates xj of x for which j ≤ n.

 
The unit ball  B∞  of ℓ∞ is compact and metrizable for the topology of pointwise convergence (the product topology). The crucial step in the Tsirelson construction is to let K be the smallest pointwise closed subset of  B∞  satisfying the following two properties:
a. For every integer  j  in N, the unit vector ej and all multiples , for |λ| ≤ 1, belong to K.
b. For any integer N ≥ 1, if  is a block-disjoint sequence in K, then  belongs to K.
This set K satisfies the following stability property:
c. Together with every element x of K, the set K contains all vectors y in  ℓ∞ such that |y| ≤ |x| (for the pointwise comparison).
It is then shown that K is actually a subset of c0, the Banach subspace of ℓ∞ consisting of scalar sequences tending to zero at infinity. This is done by proving that
d: for every element x in K, there exists an integer n such that 2 Pn(x) belongs to K,
and iterating this fact. Since K is pointwise compact and contained in  c0, it is weakly compact in c0. Let V be the closed convex hull of K in c0. It is also a weakly compact set in c0. It is shown that V satisfies b, c and d.

The Tsirelson space T* is the Banach space whose unit ball is V. The unit vector basis is an unconditional basis for T* and T* is reflexive. Therefore, T* does not contain an isomorphic copy of c0. The other ℓ p spaces, 1 ≤ p < ∞, are ruled out by condition b.

Properties 

The Tsirelson space  is distortable, but it is not known whether it is arbitrarily distortable.

The space  is a minimal Banach space. The dual space  is not minimal.

The space  is polynomially reflexive.

Derived spaces 

The symmetric Tsirelson space S(T) is polynomially reflexive and it has the approximation property. As with T, it is reflexive and no ℓ p space can be embedded into it.

Since it is symmetric, it can be defined even on an uncountable supporting set, giving an example of non-separable polynomially reflexive Banach space.

See also
 Distortion problem
 Sequence space, Schauder basis
 James' space

Notes

References 

 .
  
 .
 .
 .
 .
 .
 .
 .
 . English translation in Russian Math. Surveys 25 (1970), 111-170.
 .

External links
 Boris Tsirelson's reminiscences on his web page

Banach spaces